The Multiple Console Time Sharing System (MCTS) was an operating system developed by General Motors Research Laboratories in the 1970s for the Control Data Corporation STAR-100 supercomputer.  MCTS was built to support GM's computer-aided design (CAD) applications.

MCTS was based on Multics.

See also
GM-NAA I/O
SHARE Operating System
Timeline of operating systems

References

Further reading
 

Discontinued operating systems
Multics-like
Proprietary operating systems
Time-sharing operating systems
Supercomputer operating systems